HMS Dragon was a 74-gun  third-rate ship of the line of the Royal Navy, launched on 4 March 1760 at Deptford Dockyard.

Service History

She was commissioned in 1760, under the command of the Hon. Augustus Hervey, as part of the Western Squadron. In October 1761 she sailed for the Leeward Islands, and until March 1763 was engaged in naval operations in the Caribbean, including the Siege of Havana in 1762. as part of the Seven Years' War.

Francis Light, founder of Penang, served on HMS Dragon in 1760.

In March 1763 she was paid off, and recommissioned as a guardship at Portsmouth in May 1763, where she served until once again paid off in 1770. From 1781 she was employed as a receiving ship at Portsmouth, before being finally paid off in 1783, and she was paid off in April 1783 and sold in Portsmouth in June 1784 for £620.

Commanders of Note

Captain John Bentinck 1766 to 1769

Notes

This article includes data donated from the National Maritime Museum Warship Histories project

References

External links
 

Ships of the line of the Royal Navy
Bellona-class ships of the line
1760 ships